Little Miss Sumo is a 2018 documentary film directed and written by Matt Kay. The premise revolves around the 20-year-old sumo wrestler Hiyori Kon, one of few women practising the sport.

Release
Little Miss Sumo premiered at the 2018 London Film Festival, and was released on October 28, 2019, on Netflix.

References

External links
 
 

2018 documentary films
2018 films
Films set in Japan
Japan in non-Japanese culture
Netflix original documentary films
Sumo films
Women's sumo